Nicolas Ancion is a Belgian writer born in Liège, Wallonia, Belgium, in 1971. His parents were professional puppeteers.

Writer
He writes fiction for adults, young adults and children and is the author of several theater plays and poetry collections Humour is an essential ingredient in his works. The literary supplement of Le Monde, France's flagship daily newspaper, dubbed him "Lewis Carol's true heir".

He loves literary challenges and performances: he wrote a novel in public in 24 hours during the Brussels Book Fair (March 2010) and regularly uses web tools to share live writing.

Novel
His novel, "The 35-billion Euro Man" has been awarded the prix Rossel des jeunes in 2009. This novel describes the abduction of one of the richest men in the world, Lakshmi Mittal, CEO of ArcelorMittal. This novel is currently being adapted for the theater and the movies.

Bibliography in English
 The Man Who Refused To Die, novel illustrated by Patrice Killoffer, Dis Voir, 2010

Bibliography in French
 L'homme qui refusait de mourir, novel illustrated by Patrice Killoffer, Dis Voir, 2010
 J'arrête quand je veux, novel, Jourdan jeunesse, 2010
 L'homme qui valait 35 milliards, novel, Luc Pire - Le Grand Miroir, 2009 - Victor Rossel Young Readers Awards 2009
 Retrouver ses facultés, short stories illustrated by Pierre Kroll, Éditions de l'ULG, 2009
 Le garçon qui avait avalé son lecteur mp3, novel, Averbode, 2008
 Nous sommes tous des playmobiles, short stories, Le Grand Miroir, 2007 (Franz de Wever Award - paperback : Pocket 2008)
 Le poète fait sa pub, Bookleg, poems, Maelström, 2006 (Prix Gros Sel Award 2006)
 Carrière solo, novel, Labor, 2006
 Métro, boulot, dodo, poems, L’arbre à paroles, 2006
 Dans la cité Volta, novel, CFC, 2005
 Le garçon qui avait mangé un bus, novel, Averbode, 2004
 Haute pression, novel, Le Grand Miroir, 2004
 Le dortoir, poems, Éditions le Fram, 2004
 Les ours n’ont pas de problème de parking, short stories, Le Grand Miroir, 2001 (paperback : Pocket 2009)
 Quatrième étage, novel, Luc Pire, 2000 (Prix des Lycéens 2001 - paperback : Pocket 2010)
 39 doigts et 4 oreilles, poems illustrated by Frédéric Hainaut, Les éperonniers, 1998
 Écrivain cherche place concierge, novel, Luc Pire, 1998 (paperback : Pocket 2010)
 Le cahier gonflable, novel, L'Hèbe/les éperonniers, 1997
 Ces chers vieux monstres, poésie, Éditions Unimuse, 1997
 Ciel bleu trop bleu, roman, L'Hèbe, 1995 (Prix Jeunes Talents de la Province de Liège)

External links
Official website
Author's blog in French

Sources 

Living people
Belgian male novelists
Writers from Liège
Belgian male poets
1971 births
20th-century Belgian novelists
21st-century Belgian novelists
20th-century Belgian poets
21st-century Belgian poets
Belgian male short story writers
Belgian short story writers
20th-century short story writers
21st-century short story writers
20th-century Belgian male writers
21st-century Belgian male writers